Juan Carlos Ortega Orozco (born 19 March 1967 in) is a Mexican former footballer who currently serves as Director of Methodology and Development for Major League Soccer club LA Galaxy, where he oversees the club's youth academy and development.

Honours

Manager
Mexico U15
CONCACAF Under-15 Championship: 2017

References

External links

1967 births
Living people
Sportspeople from Jalisco
Mexican football managers
Mexican footballers
Tigres UANL footballers
Club León footballers
Correcaminos UAT footballers
Association football defenders